Antiphona is a Venezuelan mixed choir, constituted by 24 singers.
From the moment of its foundation, Antiphona has promoted in Latin American and European scenarios the choral repertoire of all times, particularly working on contemporary choral music.

Antiphona Titular Conductor is Mtro. César Alejandro Carrillo

Biography
Coral Antiphona was created in 1995 by Mtro. Juan Belmonte, former conductor of the Orquesta Sinfónica del Zulia, in Venezuela, with the purpose of having a stable group for the symphonic choral repertoire. In the present time, Antiphona acts as a nonprofit civil association of culture promotion. The choir has been conducted by Mtro. Juan Carlos Bersague from 1995 to 2008. From 2010, Antiphona Titular Conductor is Mtro. César Alejandro Carrillo.

In its curricular path, Antiphona has performed in several scenarios in Bulgaria, Colombia, Cuba, France, Hungary, Italy, Mexico, Spain and Venezuela.

Festivals and competitions
From a curricular point of view, Antiphona has participated in the following choir festivals and competitions.

Festivals:
 V Festival Internacional de Coros de Santiago de Cuba / Santiago de Cuba, Cuba 1999.
 II Festival de Coros Maracaibo un canto a Vos / Maracaibo, Venezuela 2001.
 XX Aniversario del Festival de Coros de Álava / Vitoria-Gasteiz, Spain 2001.
 I Festival Mundial de Coros de Puebla / Puebla, Mexico 2002.
 VII Festival Internacional D´Canto / Isla de Margarita, Venezuela 2004. [Prize of the audience].
 III Festival de Coros de Cámara Cantarte / Caracas, Venezuela 2004.

Competitions:
 I Concurso de Coros "Luis Soto Villalobos" / Maracaibo, Venezuela 1999. [First Prize]
 III Competencia de Coros de Mérida / Mérida, Venezuela 2002. [First Prize in Polyphony & Second Prize in Folklore categories].
 XXXVII Certamen Internacional de Masas Corales / Tolosa, Spain 2005.
 XXIV Festival-Certamen Internacional de Música de Cantonigròs / Cantonigròs, Spain. 2006. [First Prize in the Mixed Choirs Category & First Prize in the Popular Music Category].
 LII Certamen Internacional de Habaneras y Polifonía / Torrevieja, Spain 2006. [Third Prize in Habaneras Category & "Francisco Vallejos" Prize, for the best interpretation of a popular habanera].
 LV Concorso Polifonico Internazionale Guido d'Arezzo / Arezzo, Italy 2007. [Third Prize in the Polyphony Category].
 XXXVII Florilège Vocal de Tours / Tours, France 2008.
 XXXI Международен майски хоров конкурс "Проф. Г. Димитров" (International May Choir Competition Prof. G. Dimitrov) / Varna, Bulgaria 2009. [First Prize in Chamber Choirs Category].
 XXIV Bartók Béla Nemzetközi Kórusverseny (Béla Bartók International Choir Competition) / Debrecen, Hungary 2010. [Third Prize in Chamber Choirs Category].

Current members
Soprani 1
 Johanna Chacín
 Valeria Pire
 Florannedig Ortiz
Soprani 2
 Zhara Flaviani
 Daniela Gonzalez
 Sara Gonzalez
Alti 1
 Lourdes Franco
 Maria Isabel Salas
 Khiara Flaviani
Alti 2
 Migdali Herrison
 Danybel Villamizar
 Estefania Lopez
Tenori 1
 Alexis Garrido
 Keinel Aparicio
 Andrés Montilla
Tenori 2
 Hender Paz
 Deivis Herrera
Baritoni
 Hender García
 Daniel Villamizar
 Juan Diego Pire
Bassi
 Guillermo Nava
 Neldenis Montiel
 Javier Briceño

Instruments
 Héctor Eduardo Silva (Cuatro)
 Maestro César Alejandro Carrillo

External links
 Website
Blog
César Alejandro Carrillo
 References at Cantonigròs Competition, Spain
 References at Arezzo Competition, Italy
References at Debrecen Competition, Hungary

A cappella musical groups